Taxandria marginata is a species of shrub that grows in the south west corner of Western Australia. This plant was previously classified as Agonis marginata but was reclassified by Wheeler and Marchant into the new genus  Taxandria in a 2007 revision.

It produces white flowers between February and August.

It grows around granite boulders and among rocky outcrops in coastal areas in skeletal sandy, loamy or clay soils. The species is found along the south coast of Western Australia in the Great Southern and Goldfields-Esperance regions.

References

marginata
Myrtales of Australia
Rosids of Western Australia
Trees of Australia
Trees of Mediterranean climate
Taxa named by Jacques Labillardière